The 16th Rifle Corps was a corps of the Soviet Red Army, formed twice.

It took part in the Soviet invasion of Poland in 1939 and destroyed in the Baltic Operation during Operation Barbarossa.  Reformed in 1942, the corps fought through the rest of the war on the Eastern Front, and was disbanded immediately postwar.

History

First formation 
The corps was formed in November 1922 at Saratov, part of the Volga Military District. It was relocated to Orsha in October 1923 and Bryansk in November, becoming part of the Western Military District. In January 1924, the corps received the honorific "named for the Bryansk Proletariat", but on 19 November was renamed the 16th Belorussian Territorial Rifle Corps and became a territorial unit after relocating to Mogilev in October. In 1929, the corps was converted back into a regular unit. The 16th Corps fought in the Soviet invasion of Poland in September 1939, occupying what became western Belarus. It became part of the 11th Army by 22 June 1941, under the command of Major General Mikhail Mikhailovich Ivanov. The corps fought against Operation Barbarossa, the German invasion of the Soviet Union, from 22 June 1941, and was disbanded in August.

Second formation 
The second formation became part of the 18th Army, 56th Army and 33rd Army. In 1945 it consisted of the 323rd Rifle Division, 339th Rifle Division, and 383rd Rifle Division as part of the 33rd Army. It was disbanded in July 1945.

Organization 
1939:
 2nd Rifle Division
 100th Rifle Division
1941: (11th Army, North-Western Front)
 5th Rifle Division
 33rd Rifle Division
 188th Rifle Division

References

Citations

Bibliography 
 

Rifle corps of the Soviet Union
Military units and formations disestablished in 1945
Military units and formations of the Soviet invasion of Poland